Victor Gustav Bloede III (31 January 1920 – 10 February 1999), was an advertising executive for Benton & Bowles who introduced the slogan Good to the last drop for Maxwell House coffee.

He married Merle Huie, daughter of Hulon William and Anna (née Lohn) Huie, on March 11, 1945.  Merle was born in Brady, Texas, on May 4, 1921.

References

1920 births
1999 deaths
American advertising executives
Businesspeople from Baltimore